Hakim El Mokeddem (born 15 February 1999) is a French footballer who plays as a midfielder for Balma.

Club career
El Mokeddem joined Toulouse at the age of 12, and eventually made his senior debut for Toulouse in a 1–1 Ligue 1 tie with AS Monaco FC on 15 September 2018.

Released by Toulouse at the end of his contract in the summer of 2019, El Mokeddem signed initially for Laval on a one-year deal in July 2019. As soon as September of the same year he was signed by Rennes on a three-year deal, and loaned back to Laval for the remainder of the season.

El Mokeddem moved to FC Sète 34 on loan for the 2020–21 season in September 2020.

International career
Born in France, El Mokeddem is of Algerian descent. El Mokeddem is a former youth international for France. He represented the France U17s at the 2016 UEFA European Under-17 Championship.

References

External links
 
 
 
 

1999 births
Living people
Footballers from Montpellier
Association football midfielders
French footballers
France youth international footballers
French sportspeople of Algerian descent
Toulouse FC players
Stade Lavallois players
Stade Rennais F.C. players
FC Sète 34 players
Balma SC players
Ligue 1 players
Championnat National players
Championnat National 3 players